Stellar Track is an Atari VCS (later the Atari 2600) game developed by Rob Zdybel of Atari, Inc. and published by Sears under the "Tele-Games" brand in 1980. It is one of three such games that were released only through Sears. Stellar Track is a text game based on the mainframe computer game Star Trek.

Plot
Stellar Track is a game in which the player is a commander of a warship and must destroy enough aliens before running out of stardates.

Reception
Richard A. Edwards reviewed Stellar Track in The Space Gamer No. 54. Edwards commented that "Unless you're willing to pay a high price for a remake of an old standard, pass this one up."

Reviews
Joystik

References

External links
Stellar Track at Atari Mania

1980 video games
Atari games
Atari 2600 games
Atari 2600-only games
Turn-based strategy video games
Video games developed in the United States
Video games set in outer space